This is a list of prime ministers of the Democratic Republic of the Congo (formerly the Republic of the Congo and Zaire) since the country's independence in 1960.

The current Prime Minister is Jean-Michel Sama Lukonde, since 26 April 2021.

Prime ministers of the Democratic Republic of the Congo (1960–present)

(Dates in italics indicate de facto continuation of office)

Timeline

Rank by time in office

See also

 Politics of the Democratic Republic of the Congo
 President of the Democratic Republic of the Congo
 List of presidents of the Democratic Republic of the Congo
 Prime Minister of the Democratic Republic of the Congo
 List of colonial governors of the Congo Free State and Belgian Congo

Notes

References

External links
World Statesmen – Congo (Kinshasa)

Democratic Republic of the Congo
Prime ministers
Prime ministers
Prime ministers